Benajah Mallory (ca 1764 – August 9, 1853) was a farmer, merchant and political figure in Upper Canada.

He was born in the Thirteen Colonies around 1764; he was living in Vermont at the start of the American Revolution and served with the local militia. He married Abia Dayton and settled in Burford Township in Upper Canada with his father-in-law and others. When his father-in-law died, he became the community's leader. In 1798, he became a captain in the York militia. He was elected to the 4th Parliament of Upper Canada representing Norfolk, Oxford and Middlesex in 1804 and was elected to the following parliament for Oxford and Middlesex. In 1806, he was appointed justice of the peace in the London District. In 1812, with Joseph Willcocks, he resisted efforts by Isaac Brock to pass legislation preparing for war with the United States. After Brock dissolved parliament, Mallory was defeated by Mahlon Burwell in the subsequent election.

In 1813, Mallory joined the Canadian Volunteers, a militia formed by Willcocks which fought for the American side during the War of 1812. When Willcocks died during the Siege of Fort Erie in 1814, Mallory was given command of this unit. Mallory was convicted of treason in absentia and his lands in Upper Canada reverted to the Crown. He later settled in Lockport, New York. In 1838, he offered to help William Lyon Mackenzie and his followers on Navy Island. He died at Lockport in 1853.

External links 
Biography at the Dictionary of Canadian Biography Online

Members of the Legislative Assembly of Upper Canada
Canadian people of the War of 1812
1760s births
1853 deaths
British defectors to the United States
Canadian justices of the peace